The Sign Tour EP is Orphanage's eleventh release, which came out in 2003. The CD features 3 tracks the song nr. 2: "In den Bergen des Irrsinns" is a German translation of "At the Mountains of Madness", from the album "By Time Alone" 1996.

History 
The strictly limited single released for the German tour with Within Temptation, with the brand new song " The Sign", a special German version of "At the mountains of madness" ("In den Bergen des Irrsinns") and the Orphanage-classic "Inside".

Track listing
	"The Sign"	(05:01)
	"In den bergen des Irrsinns"	(06:00)	
	"Inside"	(04:39)

References

2003 EPs
Orphanage (band) albums